"Ditzy Scene" is a song by English rock band Cardiacs. It was planned as the opening track and lead single from the band's unfinished sixth album, LSD. It was released on Org Records, and was the band's last single to be released in frontman Tim Smith's lifetime, as well as their most recent to be composed of entirely new material.

"Ditzy Scene" was included in Progs list of Knifeworld frontman Kavus Torabi's Guide to Cardiacs. In 2018, the Alphabet Business Concern rereleased the song on Bandcamp.

Writing and recording
"Ditzy Scene" was written by Tim Smith and Kavus Torabi. It was the first of several songs written following a Cardiacs' line-up change in 2004. Torabi wrote the lyrics after beginning to record their unreleased sixth album, provisionally titled LSD, in 2005. He said it was planned to be remixed for the album:

The band recorded "Ditzy Scene" at Smith's own recording studio Apollo 8 in Autumn 2007, shortly before the last Cardiacs tour. Torabi wrote the lyrics to Smith's arrangement, as well as playing the guitar solo for the intro. The intro, according to Torabi, was extremely hard to play, requiring complete concentration from the band. They recorded the song with tapes. Along with Smith, vocals were provided by Torabi, bass player Jim Smith, Claire Lemmon and "special guest star" Suzanne Kirby.

In an interview with Prog, Torabi described his first reaction to the song's structure whilst recording: "When we started recording it was like 'Fucking hell ... here we go!' When those girl vocals came in at the start, going 'Aaah aaah!' it was a real goosebump moment and I thought 'Okay, we've really got something here ...' It's just brilliant."

Release and reception
On November 5, it had a limited edition press release on Org Records, with only 1000 copies made. The song charted at number 72 on the Spanish iTunes Chart on 11 October 2020.

Formats and track listings
All lyrics are written by Cardiacs; all music is composed by Tim Smith.CD single "Ditzy Scene" – 6:38
 "Gen" – 3:42
 "Made All Up" – 5:04CDr promo'
 "Ditzy Scene" – 6:38

Personnel
Credits are adapted from the liner notes of "Ditzy Scene", except where noted:
 Tim Smith – lead vocals, guitar, keyboards
 Jim Smith – vocals, bass guitar
 Kavus Torabi – vocals, guitar
 Bob Leith – drums, cymbals
 Cathy Harabaras – vocals, tube bell, big drum, percussion
 Dawn Staple – tube bell, big drum, percussion
 Melanie Woods – vocals, percussion
 Claire Lemmon – vocals
 Suzanne Kirby – guest vocals

Notes

References

External links
 
 

2007 singles
Cardiacs songs
Songs written by Tim Smith (Cardiacs)